Sardis, also known as Berlin, is an unincorporated community in Dallas County, Alabama.

History
A post office called Sardis was established in 1856. The community was named after the biblical city of Sardis.

Sardis has one site included on the National Register of Historic Places, the J. Bruce Hain House.

Notable people
Bill Hefner, U.S. Representative from 1975 to 1999
Clara Weaver Parrish, artist

References

Unincorporated communities in Alabama
Unincorporated communities in Dallas County, Alabama